Jorge Paulo Cadete Santos Reis (born 27 August 1968), known as Cadete, is a Portuguese former professional footballer who played as a striker.

Born to Portuguese parents in Mozambique, he was groomed in Sporting's prolific youth system, and later was noted while at Celtic as he led the goalscoring charts in 1996–97.

Cadete amassed Primeira Liga totals of 233 matches and 73 goals over 12 seasons. A Portuguese international throughout the 90s, he represented the nation at Euro 1996.

Club career

Early career and Sporting
Born in Pemba (then called Porto Amélia), Portuguese Mozambique, Cadete began his footballing career with Associação Académica de Santarém at age 15, scoring an impressive 43 goals in just 18 games. His exploits alerted Primeira Liga giants Sporting CP and S.L. Benfica, with the former winning the race to sign the promising youngster.

Cadete broke into the senior team in 1987–88, starting in four of his six appearances and subsequently being sent on loan to fellow league club Vitória F.C. for the following season, helping the Setúbal-based side to the fifth place. He thus returned to Lisbon, where he would play for the following five years uninterrupted and in the 1992–93 campaign he was the national championship's top-scorer with 18 goals.

Towards the end of his time at Sporting, Cadete was loaned out again in November 1994, this time to Italy's Brescia Calcio. He only managed one Serie A goal during his stint, returning subsequently to the Estádio José Alvalade and featuring in the first leg of the Supertaça Cândido de Oliveira against FC Porto in August 1995.

By early 1996, especially after the sacking of manager Bobby Robson and the arrival of Carlos Queiroz, Cadete was completely out of favour at Sporting and made no more appearances for them. He amassed competitive totals for the club of 203 games and 81 goals.

Celtic
On 24 February 1996, Cadete was introduced at Celtic Park, Glasgow to supporters before Celtic's league match against Partick Thistle. However, due to lengthy negotiations between Celtic and Sporting and issues with registering the player, his transfer was not finalised until April, and turned out to be controversial: despite being signed prior to the transfer deadline, the Scottish Football Association delayed processing his registration in time for the Scottish Cup semi-finals against Rangers at Hampden Park, and following a complaint from Celtic chairman Fergus McCann, SFA chief Jim Farry was eventually relieved of his duties after being found guilty of deliberately holding back the player's registration. His eventual debut came at home against Aberdeen as he came off the bench to score his team's fifth goal in a 5–0 win, thus becoming an instant hit; the loud roar generated by the fans celebrating his goal blew out BBC Radio 5's microphones, who had been covering the game UK wide on radio, and they went off air for a short time until it was repaired.

Cadete's only full season in Scotland was unarguably the greatest of his career, with the player finishing the year as the country's top scorer with 38 goals in 47 appearances in all competitions, without the aid of penalty kicks. Despite this, his team lost the league championship to arch-rivals Rangers, and he played his last match against Dundee United, bowing to the fans before kissing the turf.

Along with Pierre van Hooijdonk and Paolo Di Canio, Cadete became embroiled in contractual disputes with the club, and was labelled as one of the "Three Amigos" by McCann. He remained a Celtic player over the summer, but fled back to Portugal citing mental health issues and a failure to adjust to life in Scotland without his family; his requests for a transfer were eventually granted.

To Spain and beyond
After failing to show for pre-season training, Cadete was transferred to RC Celta de Vigo of La Liga for a fee of around £3,500,000. He played one full season for the Galicians, and scored on his debut on 27 September 1997 in a 3–3 draw away to Atlético Madrid. He moved to Benfica alongside former Celtic teammate van Hooijdonk in January 1999, and a year later he returned to the United Kingdom, joining newly promoted Premier League side Bradford City on loan until the end of the campaign; he made his debut as a substitute in a 1–1 draw with Aston Villa at Valley Parade, and was described as having an "instant impact" in that game.

For 2000–01, Cadete was loaned to the Lisbon-based C.F. Estrela da Amadora. As newly promoted Scottish side St Mirren looked for a striker to bolster its chances of top-flight survival, he almost made a return to the country, but the proposed January switch fell through and he remained in Estrela, subsequently seeing out his Benfica contract after claiming unpaid wages.

Retirement, return to football and Scotland
Following his release from Benfica, Cadete found himself without a club. After failing to find a new team he retired from football at the relatively young age of 33, going on to make an appearance on the celebrity version of the Big Brother reality TV show.

At the start of 2003–04 season, aged 35, Cadete decided to come out of retirement. He returned to Scotland to make a guest appearance on Tam Cowan's Scottish football show "Offside", where he spoke of his love for Celtic and how he regretted leaving; he also invited Celtic boss Martin O'Neill to give him a trial for his former club.

Cadete's return to the public eye in Scotland prompted rookie co-managers Gerry Britton and Derek Whyte to take a gamble on the striker. He signed a short-term contract for top division relegation battlers Partick Thistle in late January 2004, ending his 18-month exile from the game; the move was controversial however, as he had already agreed to sign for Raith Rovers, even being photographed in the team shirt by the media.

Cadete made his debut for the Jags on 22 February against former club Celtic, and received a mixed reception, with jeers from some Celtic fans as he came off the bench due to the manner of his departure six years earlier. Shortly after, he returned to old ways when he reported back for training 24 hours late, and was subsequently disciplined by the club; he did not manage to score for Thistle in four months, and was not offered a contract extension.

Later years
Cadete returned to his country in the 2004–05 campaign, joining third division's C.D. Pinhalnovense. He cited the major factor in signing for the club was working with coach Paco Fortes.

The following two years, Cadete played amateur football in the Beja region, with FC São Marcos in São Marcos da Ataboeira, Castro Verde, being rejoined by some former professionals in the country, including Benfica and S.C. Farense's Hassan Nader. After retiring, he faced severe economic problems.

On 23 July 2015, Cadete was appointed director of football of U.F.C. Almeirim in Santarém.

International career
Cadete won 33 caps for the Portugal national team scoring five goals, 22 while at Sporting, nine while at Celtic and two as a Celta player. His first game came on 29 August 1990, in a 1–1 friendly draw with Germany.

Cadete was chosen for the UEFA Euro 1996 finals by António Oliveira, after playing the decisive last match in the qualifying rounds against Republic of Ireland and netting the last in a 3–0 win as a substitute. His final appearance was a 0–3 defeat to England on 22 April 1998, in another friendly.

Career statistics

Club
Source:

International

|}

Honours
Sporting
Supertaça Cândido de Oliveira: 1995

Individual
Bola de Prata: 1992–93
Scottish Premier League top scorer: 1996–97
Taça de Portugal top scorer: 1992–93

References

External links

1968 births
Living people
People from Cabo Delgado Province
Colonial people in Mozambique
Portuguese footballers
Association football forwards
Primeira Liga players
Liga Portugal 2 players
Segunda Divisão players
Sporting CP footballers
Vitória F.C. players
S.L. Benfica footballers
C.F. Estrela da Amadora players
C.D. Pinhalnovense players
Serie A players
Brescia Calcio players
Scottish Football League players
Scottish Premier League players
Celtic F.C. players
Partick Thistle F.C. players
La Liga players
RC Celta de Vigo players
Premier League players
Bradford City A.F.C. players
Portugal youth international footballers
Portugal under-21 international footballers
Portugal international footballers
UEFA Euro 1996 players
Portuguese expatriate footballers
Expatriate footballers in Italy
Expatriate footballers in Scotland
Expatriate footballers in Spain
Expatriate footballers in England
Portuguese expatriate sportspeople in Italy
Portuguese expatriate sportspeople in Scotland
Portuguese expatriate sportspeople in Spain
Portuguese expatriate sportspeople in England
Scottish league football top scorers
Mozambican emigrants to Portugal